Hollow Earth is the debut album of Soma, released on December 15, 1994 through Extreme Records.

Track listing

Personnel 
Pieter Bourke – instruments
Rick O'Neil – mastering
David Thrussell – instruments, mastering

References

External links 
 

1994 debut albums
Extreme Records albums
Soma (band) albums